The National Athletics Centre is a track and field stadium that is currently under construction in Budapest, Hungary. It will host the 2023 World Athletics Championships. The stadium is being built on the eastern bank of the Danube River south of central Budapest, with a capacity of 36,000 for the championships, which will be reduced to 14,000 for future events.

References

Multi-purpose stadiums in Hungary
Sports venues in Budapest
Proposed stadiums
Proposed buildings and structures in Hungary